The 2022 New Zealand bravery awards were announced via a Special Honours List on 26 October 2022. The awards recognised the bravery of seven helicopter pilots during the Whakaari / White Island eruption on 9 December 2019, and one New Zealand Defence Force soldier during a live grenade practice in June 2020.

New Zealand Bravery Star (NZBS)
The New Zealand Bravery Star was awarded for an act of outstanding bravery in a situation of danger:
 Robert Mark Law – of Whakatāne.

New Zealand Bravery Decoration (NZBD)
The New Zealand Bravery Decoration was awarded for an act of exceptional bravery in a situation of danger:
 Timothy Robin Barrow – of Rotorua.
 Jason William Hill – of Ōpōtiki.
 Graeme Hopcroft – of Tauranga.
 Sam Peter Jones – of Tauranga.
 Callum Mill – of Rotorua.
 Thomas Sandford Storey – of Ōpōtiki.

New Zealand Bravery Medal (NZBM)
The New Zealand Bravery Medal was awarded for an act of bravery:
 Acting Warrant Officer Class 2 Michael Anthony Marvin – of Pahiatua.

References

New Zealand Royal Honours System
Bravery awards
Hon
New Zealand bravery awards